Coprosma acutifolia, is a shrub that is native to New Zealand, found only on Raoul Island. C. acutifolia can grow up to 12 metres tall in wet or dry forest, becoming a sub-canopy tree at lower altitudes and a canopy species along ridgelines.

Tree up to c. 10 m. tall; branches ascending; branchlets slender, glab. Lvs on slender petioles 5–7 mm. long. Stipules membr., sheathing, sub-acute; denticle prominent. Lamina membr., glab., ovate to ovate-elliptic to lanceolate, acuminate, tapering to petiole; ± 60-(75) × 20- (35) mm.; margins ± waved. Reticulated veins fine, evident. ♂ 3–9 on slender axillary branched peduncles 10–15 mm. long; calyx cupular, teeth 4–5, acute; corolla subfunnelform, lobes 5, acute, ± = tube; stamens us. 5. ♀ 3 in a cluster on branched axillary peduncles; calyx cupular, teeth triangular, us. 5; corolla tubular, lobes linear-triangular, < tube. Drupe orange-red, oblong, 7–8 mm. long.

Etymology
The genus name, Coprosma derives from the Greek kopros ("dung") and osme ("smell"), and describes the genus' foul smell, while the specific epithet, acutifolia,  derives from Latin, and means "sharp-leaved".

References

acutifolia
Flora of New Zealand
Taxa named by Joseph Dalton Hooker
Plants described in 1857